Huntik: Secrets & Seekers is an Italian animated television series created by Iginio Straffi, the creator of Winx Club. In Italy, the series premiered on Rai Due on 12 January 2009 at 7:25 a.m. Media Blasters released the first season on DVD in four volumes through its Anime Works label. Huntiks animation studio, Rainbow SpA, first released a trailer for the second season in July 2011. In Italy, the new season premiered on Rai Due on 17 September 2011. Rai Gulp replayed the episodes beginning on 22 September.

Following the 2011 purchase in which Viacom gained 30% ownership of Rainbow SpA, Huntik was broadcast on Viacom's Nickelodeon channels worldwide, including Nicktoons in the United States. The second season made its American premiere on Nicktoons, and the full episodes were distributed on Nicktoons' website.

Episode list

Season 1 (2009)

Season 2 (2011)

References

External links
Huntik: Secrets & Seekers on RaiPlay

Huntik: Secrets and Seekers